The Engracia de Jesus Matias Archives and Special Collections is a department of the Arthur A. Wishart Library at Algoma University in Sault Ste. Marie, Ontario.  It is the official repository for the university's records as well as those of the Anglican Diocese of Algoma and the Ecclesiastical Province of Ontario.  It is a partner with the Shingwauk Residential Schools Centre, also located at the university. The archives collects private records of individuals, families, organizations and businesses with a focus on northern Ontario.

History
The Engracia de Jesus Matias Archives and Special Collections (formerly the Algoma University Archives) were established in 2006 and renamed in honour of Engracia de Jesus Matias.

Collections 
As of 2016 the archives holds over 170 unique archival fonds or collections.  Areas of strength include the history of higher education in Sault Ste. Marie; faculty, staff and student associations at the university, university programming, the industrial history of the Great Lakes region; the railroad history of northern Ontario; the history of the fur trader Charles Oakes Ermatinger and the Ermatinger Old Stone House; the labour history of Sault Ste. Marie; the sinking of the SS Edmund Fitzgerald and Anglican Diocese of Algoma history from Kakabeka Falls the west to the Ontario/Quebec border in the east and from Manitouwadge in the north to Gravenhurst in the south.

References

External links
 Engracia de Jesus Matias Archives and Special Collections
 Diocese of Algoma: Anglican(Episcopal) Church of Canada
 The Ecclesiastical Province of Ontario
 Ermatinger Old Stone House

Algoma University
Archives in Canada